Kang Full (or Kang Pool) is the pen name of Kang Do-young (born December 7, 1974), a South Korean webtoon artist. Though he had no formal training in art or writing, Kang launched a website in 2002 to display his comics. Kang's webtoons quickly drew attention, resulting in several film adaption based on his works.

Career
Regarded as a "first generation" webtoon artist, Kang had no formal teaching in either writing or drawing comics. His interest stemmed from painting wall posters for the student body at Sangji University, turning them into eye-catching comics in order to attract attention. As a student, he earned the nickname Kang Full by often wearing green clothes, 'full'(풀) meaning 'grass'(풀) in Korean.

Kang decided to become a comic artist prior to his graduation, but initially received little interest from publishers. In April 2002, he launched a personal website and began posting his work online, to great success. By 2008, his comics had reached in excess of 300 million page views. Kang has also drawn attention from the Korean film industry, and several films, including APT, BA:BO, Hello, Schoolgirl, Pained, The Neighbor, and 26 Years, have been based on his work. He has also been hired as the screenwriter for a prequel to the 2006 film The Host.

Besides webtoons, Kang has also created several comic books oriented to kids. His picture book Hi, Friend has been nominated as a 14th popular book for a very short time.

Bibliography

Screen adaptations 
 순정만화 (Hello schoolgirl) 2008 
 아파트 (Apartment) 2006 
 바보 (Ba;Bo) 2008 
 26년 (26 year) 2012 
 그대를 사랑합니다 (I love you) 2010 
 The Neighbor (2012) 
 Timing (2014)
 Moving (2022)

References

External links 
 Kang Full at HanCinema

1974 births
South Korean manhwa artists
South Korean screenwriters
South Korean webtoon creators
People from Seoul
Sangji University alumni
Living people